The first season of the Mexican anthology television series Sin miedo a la verdad created by Rubén Galindo premiered on Las Estrellas on 8 October 2018, and concluded on 4 November 2018. The first season consists of 21 episodes.

Plot 
Manu is an introverted man with special abilities, not only to repair cell phones, but to violate systems and passwords. Thanks to Doña Cata, his mentor, he has managed to survive hidden from a cruel past that still haunts him, leaving a terrible shadow in his soul and marking on his face. Manu works in the Plaza de la Computación, where they repair, adjust and get any kind of electronic devices and the only way Manu has to deal with the pain his past causes him is, helping others, so that through his vlog "Sin miedo a la verdad", he will be who anonymously protects those who have been victims of some injustice. As Manu goes about solving cases, he is persecuted by devil policeman Horacio, a corrupt cop, main perpetrator and responsible for the murder of Manu and Estefani's father, who wants to take revenge on Manu for killing his rapist brother and dirty cop.

Cast 
 Alex Perea as Manuel "Manu" Montero
 Dacia González as Catalina Gómez
 Tania Niebla as Berenice Hidalgo
 Ligia Uriarte as Lety
 Fermín Martínez as Horacio Escamilla
 Israel Islas as Isidro Escamilla
 Paola Miguel as María José Hidalgo
 Arturo Nahum as Alberto Gómez "Pila"
 Carlos Barragán as Cuauhtémoc Sánchez "El Bolillo"
 Ana Cristina Rubio as Estefani Montero
 Catalina López as Amanda
 Víctor Cerveira as Chicho
 Eugenio Montessoro as Alfredo Alonso

Episodes

References 

2018 Mexican television seasons